Classic is an album of re-recordings by Canadian singer-songwriter Bryan Adams. It was released digitally through Badams Music Limited on April 1, 2022, and it contains new studio takes of songs from the 1980s and 1990s, including "Summer of '69", "Heaven", "Run to You" and "Please Forgive Me". Classic is the 17th studio release by Adams and the third album he has unveiled in less than one month. On March 4, 2022, he digitally released Pretty Woman – The Musical and on March 11, 2022, he released his 15th official studio album So Happy It Hurts.

Background 
In the run-up to releasing So Happy It Hurts, Bryan Adams spoke about how he decided to re-record his older material after his now-former record label, Universal Music Group, refused to return his original masters. In an interview with Cleveland.com, he said: "I was in the process of renegotiating with Universal (Music Group) and they wouldn't give anything back. I said, 'OK, if you don't want to give them back, I'll make new ones.' It was incredible fun. I'm gonna call the album Classic, maybe Part 1 'cause there'll be a Part 2 I'll finish up this year. This is all part of the fun I've been having. I love the way So Happy It Hurts came out, so much so that I wanted to continue just recording 'cause I felt like we were in a groove, and let's just keep going. So, I've got a lot of music coming out this year—get ready!"

Adams, who performed "Summer of 69" live with Taylor Swift in 2018, credited her with the idea of re-recording his previous work. "I loved singing with Taylor, in fact I believe it's the best version of the song since the original recording. She and I have been in a similar situation lately with our master recordings... so I've done what she has done to re-record my early songs again. I’m releasing a few in March, so thanks Taylor," Adams told Stereogum.

In a conversation with The Daily Telegraph, Adams said he should have made the album a long time ago: "I feel like a complete numpty for taking so long, I wish I'd done it 10 years ago. But it doesn't matter. It's all right. It's basically something for my kids."

Release and promotion 
Adams announced the digital release of Classic on his official Instagram page on April 1, 2022. A few hours later, the eight tracks were posted on YouTube—six audio-only and two new videos. New videos have been produced for "Heaven" and "Run to You".

Track listing

Personnel 
 Bryan Adams – vocals, producer
 Bob Clearmountain – mixing on all tracks except "Hidin' from Love"
 Hayden Watson – engineering, mixing on "Hidin' from Love"

Charts

References 

2022 albums
Bryan Adams albums